This glossary of entomology describes terms used in the formal study of insect species by entomologists.

A–C

 A synthetic chlorinated hydrocarbon insecticide, toxic to vertebrates. Though its phytotoxicity is low, solvents in some formulations may damage certain crops. cf. the related Dieldrin, Endrin, Isodrin

D–F

 A synthetic chlorinated hydrocarbon insecticide, toxic to vertebrates.  cf. the related Aldrin, Endrin, Isodrin

 A synthetic chlorinated hydrocarbon insecticide, toxic to vertebrates. Though its phytotoxicity is low, solvents in some formulations may damage certain crops. cf. the related Dieldrin, Aldrin, Isodrin

G–L

 

 

 

 

 

 

 A synthetic chlorinated hydrocarbon insecticide, toxic to vertebrates. Though its phytotoxicity is low, solvents in some formulations may damage certain crops. cf. the related Dieldrin, Aldrin, Endrin

M–O

P–R

S–Z

Figures

See also
 Anatomical terms of location
 Butterfly
 Caterpillar
 Comstock–Needham system
 External morphology of Lepidoptera
 Glossary of ant terms
 Glossary of spider terms
 Glossary of scientific names
 Insect wing
 Pupa

References

 
 
 Gordh G. and D.H. Headrick. A Dictionary of Entomology. Cabi 2001.
 Romoser, William S. The Science of Entomology, pp. 26–49. Collier-MacMillan 1973.
 McAlpine, David K., 1958 A key to the Australian families of Acalptrate Diptera (Insecta) Records of the Australian Museum 24 (12) 183-190 pdf full text and figures
 McAlpine, J.F. 1981 Morphology and terminology In: McAlpine, J.P. et al. (eds.): Manual of Nearctic Diptera vol. 1 Ottawa: Research Branch, Agriculture Canada, Monograph 27.  pdf download manual
 Resh, Vincent H. and R. T. Cardé, Eds. Encyclopedia of Insects, pp. 15–19, 750–755. Elsevier 2003.
 Wallace, Robert L. et al. Beck and Braithwaite's Invertebrate Zoology, 4th Ed., pp. 248–250. MacMillan 1989.
 
 http://www.cals.ncsu.edu/course/ent425/library/labs/external_anatomy/anatomy_mouthparts.html

External links
 Dictionary of Insect Morphology
 Dragonfly terms
 Entomologists' Glossary
 Dictionary of Insect Morphology
 PNW moths glossary

Entomology
Entomology terms, glossary of
Wikipedia glossaries using description lists